Fall Out Fall In is a Walt Disney cartoon starring Donald Duck.  It was released on April 23, 1943, by RKO Radio Pictures. The film's title incorporates two military commands: "fall in," meaning to create an organized formation of soldiers, and "fall out," to dissolve that formation.

Plot
Donald, an Army private, is on an all-day march with his unit. He keeps up his enthusiasm for the first few miles and starts to mark them off on the pack of the soldier in front of him, but fatigue and unforgiving weather conditions - first rain, then snow, then heat - soon take their toll on him. By the time the unit commander calls a halt for the day, the tally marks cover not only the soldier's pack, but the backs of his arms, legs, and helmet as well. An exhausted and famished Donald quickly dumps out a mountain of gear from his pack, but he is not allowed to eat until he has set up his tent. It takes him only seconds to do this, but the tent soon collapses and he ends up struggling long into the night to set it up again. He dumps a bucket of water over the sagging canvas, causing it to shrink and rip in half.

As Donald tries to get some sleep, the peculiar snoring patterns of his fellow soldiers - bugler, drummer, machine gunner, mortar artilleryman - keep waking him up. The moment he passes out from exhaustion, the bugler plays reveille to wake everyone up for the new day. He hurriedly crams all his gear into his pack, now comically bulging out in all directions, but inadvertently lashes it to a pine tree as he is tying down the cover. When the unit moves out, he stumbles after the other soldiers, uprooting the pine tree and dragging it along with his pack.

Voice cast
 Donald Duck: Clarence Nash

Home media
The short was released on May 18, 2004, on Walt Disney Treasures: Walt Disney on the Front Lines and on December 6, 2005, on Walt Disney Treasures: The Chronological Donald, Volume Two: 1942-1946.

References

External links 
 

1943 films
1943 animated films
1943 short films
1940s Disney animated short films
Donald Duck short films
RKO Pictures animated short films
Films directed by Jack King
Films produced by Walt Disney
Military humor in film
World War II films made in wartime
Films scored by Paul Smith (film and television composer)
Films about the United States Army